The women's pentathlon event  at the 1993 IAAF World Indoor Championships was held on 12 March. Held for the first time, pentathlon was a non-championship event at this edition and the medals awarded did not count towards the total medal status.

Irina Belova of Russia had originally won the gold medal but was later disqualified for doping.

Results

References

Official results

Pentathlon
Combined events at the World Athletics Indoor Championships
1993 in women's athletics